Zerizer  is a town and commune in El Taref Province, Algeria. According to the 1998 census it has a population of 10,105.

References

Communes of El Taref Province